Judith Margaret Brown (born 9 July 1944) is a British historian, academic and Anglican priest, who specialises in the study of modern South Asia. From 1990 to 2011, she was the Beit Professor of Commonwealth History and a Fellow of Balliol College, Oxford. Earlier she taught at the University of Manchester and completed her Ph.D. at Girton College, Cambridge. Brown was born in India but educated in Britain. She retired from teaching in 2011.

Ordained ministry
Brown felt the call to ordination when she was young, before the ordination of women was allowed in the Anglican Communion. Having trained at Ripon College Cuddesdon, she was ordained in the Church of England as a deacon in 2009 and as a priest in 2010. From 2009 to 2010, she served her curacy at St Frideswide's Church, Osney, in the Diocese of Oxford. Since 2014, she has been an associate priest of St Mary Magdalen's Church, Oxford. She served as interim chaplain to Brasenose College, Oxford in 2017; the first woman to serve as chaplain of the college.

Selected bibliography
; 1st edition 1977

See also
British Raj
Company rule in India
Indian rebellion of 1857

References

1944 births
Academics of the Victoria University of Manchester
Alumni of Girton College, Cambridge
Fellows of Balliol College, Oxford
Historians of South Asia
Living people
Beit Professors of Commonwealth History
British women historians
British historians
21st-century English Anglican priests